York House Recordings, also known as YHR or YHR Tapes, was a small British independent label which released 31 original cassettes of industrial, electronic, experimental, avant-garde, and dark ambient music between 1979 and 1983.

History

York House Recordings was founded by David Elliott, who also published a magazine called Neumusik. Elliott put out a series of cassettes in parallel with the magazine featuring artists from all over the world.

YHR released music by Cluster & Farnbauer (Live In Vienna) and Asmus Tietchens (Musik aus der Grauzone and Musik An Der Grenze) which had been rejected as too unusual by Sky Records.  Other notable artists with releases by YHR include Maurizio Bianchi, Günter Schickert, Andrew Cox, Peter Schäfer, Paul Nagle, Duallien, and Elliott's own band MFH, later known as Pump.

Many YHR releases were subsequently reissued by Auricle Music on cassette after the demise of the label.  A number have also been reissued on LP or CD by an assortment of labels.

Catalogue
YHR 001  MFH  First Move  (1980)
YHR 002  MFH  Within 30 Miles  (1980)
YHR 003  Andrew Cox  Arioch  (1980)
YHR 004  Gordon Alien  O Puss  (1980)
YHR 005  Maurizio Bianchi  Voyeur Tape  (1980)
YHR 006  Maurizio Bianchi  Cold Tape  (1980)
YHR 007  Ping-Pong the Bear  No, Never any Greyhounds  (1980)
YHR 008  Andrew Cox  Methods  (1980)
YHR 009  MFH  Masks  (1980)
YHR 010  DAS  DAS I  (1980)
YHR 011  Nik Lumsden  Alarms & Excursions  (1981)
YHR 012  Andreas Grosser  Venite Visum  (1981)
YHR 013  Various Artists  YHR Volume I  (1981)
YHR 014  Fondation  Métamorphoses  (1981)
YHR 015  Cluster & Farnbauer  Live in Vienna  (1981)
YHR 016  MFH  Ground Zero  (1981)
YHR 017  Andrew Cox  Hydra  (1981)
YHR 018  Paul Nagle  The Soft Room  (1981)
YHR 019  Asmus Tietchens  Musik aus der Grauzone  (1981)
YHR 020  Conrad Schnitzler  Conrad & Sequenza  (1981)
YHR 021  Paul Nagle  Tree & Leaf  (1982)
YHR 022  The Klingons  Analog-Digital  (1982)
YHR 023  Rüdiger Lorenz  Earthrise  (1983)
YHR 024  Asmus Tietchens  Musik an der Grenze  (1983)
YHR 025  Andrew Cox  Songs from the Earth  (1983)
YHR 026  Cinéma Vérité  Rhythmus und Ritual  (1983)
YHR 027  Peter Schäfer  Schaf im Wolfspelz  (1983)
YHR 028  MFH  Head  (1983)
YHR 029  Yin Yang  Flusswelt  (1983)
YHR 030  Duallein  Noch kein Regen für Alle  (1983)
YHR 031  Günter Schickert  Kinder in der Wildnis  (1983)

Notes

References
 Cassette liner notes
 Discogs YHR Tapes,  retrieved 17 October 2007.
 Exotique Music: The Industrial Exchange ultra-rare cassettes,  retrieved 17 October 2007.
 Schickert, Günter Selected Releases  Retrieved 17 October 2007.
 SoundOhn Maurizio Bianchi - detailed discography, retrieved 17 October 2007.

See also
 List of electronic music record labels
 List of record labels

Electronic music record labels
British independent record labels
Record labels established in 1979
Industrial record labels